Elliot Pennington (born April 30, 1987) is an American former ice dancer who competed with Jane Summersett. They won junior bronze medals at the 2005 ISU Junior Grand Prix in Poland and 2006 U.S. Championships.

Competitive highlights
(with Summersett)

Programs 
(with Summersett)

References

External links 
 

American male ice dancers
Living people
1987 births